The Associated Press NFL Comeback Player of the Year Award is presented annually by the Associated Press (AP) to a player in the National Football League (NFL). While the criteria for the award is imprecise, it is typically given to a player who shows perseverance in overcoming adversity from not being able to play the previous season, such as an injury, or for playing well in comparison to the previous year's poor performance. If a player can come back from such adversity or play at a high level over the previous year, they will usually be favored to win the award. The winner is selected by a nationwide panel of media personnel. Since 2011, the award has been presented at the NFL Honors ceremony held the day before the Super Bowl.

The AP first recognized an NFL comeback player of the year from 1963 to 1966, but these players are typically not included in overall lists of winners. The AP did not give the award again until the 1998 season. The only player to receive the award more than once, after the AFL–NFL merger, is quarterback Chad Pennington, who received it in 2006 with the New York Jets and in 2008 with the Miami Dolphins.

Winners

See also
 National Football League Comeback Player of the Year Award for an overview of similar awards from other organizations

References
General
 
 
Footnotes

National Football League trophies and awards